= Tony Braxton =

Tony Braxton may refer to:

- Toni Braxton (born 1967) female American R&B musician
- Anthony Braxton (born 1945) male American free jazz musician
